The 2012–13 season is Odense Boldklub's 125th anniversary year. They started this season with a new manager, Troels Bech. They began the season winning 1–0 against Brøndby IF.

Odense Boldklub placed 4th in the Danish Superliga after 19 rounds played.

Squad statistics

Danish Superliga

League table

Positions by round

Matches

Round 1: Brøndby IF vs OB 

Brøndby IF vs Odense BK was the opening match of the 2012-13 Danish Superliga season. The match were played at Brøndby Stadium, with a very low attendance from the home crowd. The Brøndby manager Auri Skarbalius chose to bench Michael Krohn-Dehli, who was the big star for Denmark at the UEFA Euro 2012, because he stayed on a too long vacation in connection with the tournament.
OB took the lead after 17 minutes with a goal by Jacob Schoop, which was his first goal in the OB-jersey. Brøndby created more chances in the second half, and after 78 minutes Clarence Goodson equalized to 1-1, but the referee Lars Christoffersen cancelled the goal because Goodson pushed Daniel Høegh in the back. OB won the opening match 1–0. It was the first match with Troels Bech as the manager of Odense Boldklub.

Round 2: OB vs Randers FC 

Odense BK vs Randers FC was the second match of the 2012-13 Danish Superliga season.

Round 3: FC Nordsjælland vs OB 

FC Nordsjælland vs Odense BK was the third match in the 2012-13 Danish Superliga. The match ended 1-1 after FC Nordsjælland led 1-0 most of the game since the 16th minute. But in the 81st minute Kalilou Traoré equalized to 1-1 for OB.

Round 4: Silkeborg IF vs OB 

Silkeborg IF vs Odense BK was the fourth round of the 2012-13 Danish Superliga. The game took place at Mascot Park in Silkeborg. Most of the chances was for Silkeborg, but they didn't get the ball over the line. Instead in 3 minutes extra time, OB got the leading goal - out of nowhere - by Morten Skoubo.

Round 5: OB vs FC Midtjylland 

Odense BK vs FC Midtjylland was the fifth match of the 2012-13 Danish Superliga season.

Round 6: SønderjyskE vs OB 

SønderjyskE vs Odense BK was the sixth round of the 2012-13 Danish Superliga. It was a match between number 2 and 3 in the league. OB won 1–2, and took the 2nd place from SønderjyskE. It was also their 3rd victory in a row.

Round 7: OB vs AaB

Round 8: OB vs FC Copenhagen 

Odense BK vs FC Copenhagen was the eighth match of the 2012-13 Danish Superliga season. Before kick-off, Kalilou Traoré got honored, because of his last game for OB, after switching to FC Sochaux.

Round 9: Esbjerg fB vs OB

Round 10: AC Horsens vs OB

Round 11: OB vs AGF

Round 12: OB vs FC Nordsjælland

Round 13: FC Midtjylland vs OB 

FC Midtjylland vs Odense BK was the 13th round in the 2012-13 Danish Superliga. OB dominated the first half, and got the leading goal after 34 minutes by Krisztián Vadócz. After the break, FC Midtjylland got a lot of more chances, but after a few minutes Izunna Uzochukwu got sent off the pitch after stamping Krisztián Vadócz's shin. But that didn't stop FC Midtjylland continuing create chances, while OB's Marcus Pedersen got a red card too. The referee Lars Christoffersen added 6 more minutes, and that was enough for Midtjylland to get an equalizer.

Round 14: OB vs AGF

Round 15: Brøndby IF vs OB

Round 16: OB vs SønderjyskE

Round 17: Randers FC vs OB

Round 18: Silkeborg IF vs OB

Round 19: OB vs Esbjerg fB

Transfers

In

Loan in

Out

Matches

Competitive

Topscorers

References 

Odense Boldklub seasons
Odense Boldklub season